Ayles is an English surname. Notable people with the name include:

 Adam Ayles (1850–1912), English Arctic explorer
 Walter Ayles (1879–1953), British Labour Party politician
 Francis Ayles (1880–1939), Australian cricketer and football umpire
 Lewis C. Ayles (1927–2009), Canadian politician
 Eric Ayles (1928–1972), English rugby league footballer 
 Gary Ayles (born 1964), British racing car driver

Surnames of English origin